Cecilia Dopazo (born 17 November 1969) is an Argentine actress. She appeared in more than twenty films since 1977.

Selected filmography

References

External links 
 

1969 births
Living people
Argentine film actresses